Cordillera de Colán National Sanctuary is a protected area in Peru located in the Amazonas Region, in the Bagua and Utcubamba provinces.

See also 
 Natural and Cultural Peruvian Heritage

References

External links 
 www.enjoyperu.com / Cordillera de Colán Reserved Zone(Spanish)

Reserved zones of Peru
Geography of Amazonas Region